Chemical Research Society of India (CRSI) is an India based scientific society dedicated to field of chemistry. It was established in 1999 as a part of celebrating India's 50th anniversary of independence. C. N. R. Rao became its founder president and the organization currently has 1500 lifetime members.

References

Chemistry societies
Scientific organisations based in India
1999 establishments in Rajasthan
Scientific organizations established in 1999
Organisations based in Rajasthan